This is a list of diseases of chickpeas (Cicer arietinum)

Nematodes, parasitic

Viral diseases

Phytoplasmal diseases

References
Common Names of Diseases, The American Phytopathological Society

Chickpea
Pulse crop diseases